The 2012 Volta a Catalunya was the 92nd running of the Volta a Catalunya cycling stage race. It started on 19 March in Calella and ended on 25 March in Barcelona, and consisted of seven stages. It was the fifth race of the 2012 UCI World Tour season.

Albasini won the general classification by 90 seconds over runner-up Samuel Sánchez of the  team. Third place was taken by 's Jurgen Van den Broeck, after thirteen riders finished the race with a deficit of 92 seconds to Albasini; Van Den Broeck recorded the lowest cumulative score for his stage positions, and as a result, was placed highest of the group of riders. In the race's other classifications, Tomasz Marczyński of  won the white jersey for the most points gained in intermediate sprints, while  rider Chris Anker Sørensen won the King of the Mountains classification, and  finished at the head of the teams classification.

Teams
As the Volta a Catalunya was a UCI World Tour event, all 18 UCI ProTeams were invited automatically and obligated to send a squad. Five other squads were given wildcard places into the race, and as such, formed the event's 23-team peloton.

The 23 teams that competed in the race were:

Route

Stages

Stage 1
19 March 2012 — Calella to Calella, 

The five riders managed to extend their advantage over the main field to in excess of six minutes at one point during the stage, which was run in largely dry conditions apart from the second categorised climb – of three during the stage – of the first-category Coll Formic, where the riders were met by wet conditions with hail also falling. The breakaway's advantage had been cut to around three and a half minutes as the main field moved over the climb at Coll Formic, but the quintet managed to put more time into the pack, after their pace relented slightly. Their gap almost topped four minutes once again, before  and the  forced the cause from the field, and again the time between the groups dwindled.

By the time that the field had reached the final climb of the day, the Alt de Collsacreu. At this moment, Albasini stepped up his pace, soloed off the front of the gruppetto and quickly distanced himself from his four companions, who had split into two groups of two riders. At first, Delaplace and Edet tried to stay with Albasini, but could not; while Duggan and Gastauer decided not to follow the French duo, and would try to fend off the main field if they could.  picked up the reins on the front of the peloton, and looked to close in on Duggan and Gastauer, who had fallen around a minute behind Albasini with around  remaining. Albasini remained well clear into Calella and eventually claimed his first victory for the  team, and the team's second in three days after Simon Gerrans' win in Milan–San Remo the previous Saturday. As well as leading the general classification, Albasini held the lead of the mountains classification, after leading over two of the three climbs. Delaplace finished second, 42 seconds in arrears, after dropping Edet in the closing kilometres; Edet finished around half a minute later in third place. The peloton was not far behind; led over the line 18 seconds later by 's Kenny van Hummel, after Duggan and Gastauer – the only rider to be passed by van Hummel – were caught in the finishing straight.

Stage 2
20 March 2012 — Girona to Girona, 

Three riders – 's Jordi Simón,  rider Julián Sánchez and Cyril Bessy of  – advanced clear of the main field after  of the stage, and managed to extend their advantage to a maximum of over seven minutes at one point during the early running of the stage. Noting the peloton's inability to recapture the entire breakaway on the opening stage,  established themselves on the front of the pack; protecting their overall leader Michael Albasini from losing any potential time on the road. As such, by the time the race had reached the mid-stage feeding area, the trio out front only held a lead of around two minutes over the advancing peloton. 's Alejandro Valverde took a tumble as the race was passing through; his front wheel hit a discarded drinks bottle, and crashed into a kerb. He would ultimately lose over two minutes on the day, after failing to make the junction back to the field.

 then assumed the leadership of the peloton, looking to help with Levi Leipheimer's bid for the overall race as a whole; in a reverse to what occurred at Paris–Nice earlier in the month where  initiated the pace when Leipheimer fell three times during the penultimate stage. The breakaway's gap out front quickly dwindled, and were caught with over  left to travel in the stage. This allowed for the Alt dels Angels, a first-category climb  from the end, to take a greater presence in the stage's running, increasing the chances of riders going off the front to attack. After Leipheimer and Tejay van Garderen made failed bids to get away, three riders – 's Damiano Cunego,  rider Dan Martin and Matteo Carrara of  – went clear on the descent and held station off the front until the closing stages. A reduced peloton contested the sprint in Girona; Bradley Wiggins tried to set the sprint up for his  team-mate Rigoberto Urán, but Albasini surprised the field by accelerating clear in the finishing straight and picked up his second successive stage victory. Urán finished third behind 's Dario Cataldo.

Stage 3

As such, both climbs were removed from the itinerary, and the stage finish was moved to Canturri, on the lower slopes of the Port del Cantó. This occurred after the start of the stage, which had commenced in cold, wet conditions; several riders elected not to take the start including 's Alejandro Valverde after his stage 2 crash, and  rider Daniel Navarro, who had been ill for the previous week. All three abandoned, with Dean later taken to hospital in Valencia for surgery, after breaking his leg in a collision with a parked car.

The stage's primary breakaway commenced forming at the  mark, on the ascent of the first climb, the first-category Alt de Coubet. This trio were eventually by another nine riders from two distinct groups, with the best-placed of these riders being Mikaël Cherel – who after two solid finishes in the opening two stages of the race – in third position in the general classification. The break quickly extended their gap to the main field, reaching a maximum of nigh on eleven minutes at the  point of the stage. The inclement weather failed to relent, forcing organisers to deploy snow-clearing machinery at the finish, in a bid to run the stage at its full length. Ultimately, their bid to do so was futile as race organisers could not guarantee a safe finish into Port Ainé, a ski station in the Pyrenees.

The peloton came across the line around eight minutes later, having cut into the lead in the false hope that the stage would run its full parcours. Several hours after the stage was completed, it was announced that the timings would not count towards the general classification, but points towards the mountains and sprints classifications would count. This meant that – while losing the lead of the mountains classification to Sørensen –  rider Michael Albasini maintained his 92-second advantage at the head of the race, and also assumed the lead of the sprints classification after previous leader Anthony Delaplace, like 32 other riders, abandoned during the stage.

The announcement of neutralising the time gaps came as no surprise to many of the riders and team members. Stage winner Brajkovič described the stage and its conditions as the "hardest day of his life", while runner-up on the day Gołaś noted that it was not until he saw race officials that he knew where the finish of the stage was. Fellow team director José Azevedo was more frank with his comments; he expressed dismay at the late nature of being told about the stage's shortening, and anger at other riders for failing to wait for crashed riders in the early stages. The order of riders placed 3rd to 7th were subsequently revised on the UCI's official results service, but as of May 2012 remained unchanged on the event organisers' site.

Stage 4
22 March 2012 — Tremp to Ascó, 

Following on from the tumultuous third stage, the fourth stage began without two of the overnight top ten riders in the general classification. Fifth-placed Arnold Jeannesson failed to start the stage due to a knee injury, as a result of a crash during the third stage. The stage itself was also delayed from its original start time after five teams were snowed in on the Port Ainé, following yesterday's racing. Once the stage commenced,  rider Julián Sánchez made it into the breakaway for the second time in three days, with  represented once again, this time through Jesús Rosendo; and the breakaway was completed by Belgium's Romain Zingle, riding for the  team.

The breakaway trio's maximum advantage over the main field came early on in the stage; after , they held a lead of almost five minutes, but that was quickly whittled down, and by the time the trio entered the finishing circuit in Ascó for the first of two  laps – not including the closing  run-in – the gap was around two-and-a-half minutes. The trio were caught by a gruppetto of around 25 riders in the proximity of the climb of the Coll de Paumeres; Zingle on the ascent, and Rosendo and Sánchez on the descent.

Stage 5
23 March 2012 — Ascó to Manresa, 

Mini-attacks set the course for the stage as the field remained as one, for much of the first half of the stage. It was not until after  that the stage's primary breakaway had been formed. Javier Ramírez of  also went clear of the main field, but could not catch up to the sextet out front, and was eventually pulled back by the peloton. At the intermediate sprint, coming after  in Santa Coloma de Queralt, the breakaway held a lead of seven-and-a-half minutes over the peloton. That gap was reduced as several teams picked up the pace on the front of the peloton; with  remaining of the stage, the breakaway group held an advantage of five minutes over the rest of the field, and the time gap was reducing at a rate of a minute per .

By the time the race had reached the second, and final, climb of the day, the Alt de Montserrat, the gap had been more than halved down to a gap of 2' 10". Frank attacked on the climb, and took Sørensen, Edet and García with him, but with the peloton closing ever nearer, the chances of a successful breakaway diminished. In fact, the four remaining breakaway riders held a lead of just 23 seconds at the top of the climb, and were eventually caught on the descent. Damiano Cunego and Levi Leipheimer ( both tried to push clear of the reduced group of elite contenders, but were both closed down not long after. Cunego's luck was against him also, as he punctured close to the finish.

Stage 6
24 March 2012 — Sant Fruitós de Bages to Badalona, 

Just like the previous day's stage, mini-attacks set the course for the early running; at least four separate groups attacked inside the first  of the parcours. It was at this point that two riders decided to venture clear of the peloton; French duo David Moncoutié and Cédric Pineau set the tempo off the front, and were chased by several other riders. 's Ryder Hesjedal was among those chasing after Moncoutié and Pineau, in the hope of bringing himself back into overall contention, having been as high as second in the overall classification earlier in the week. The group was brought back however, but another French rider, Mikaël Cherel of the  team, bridged up to his compatriots and they set about extending their gap over the field; the peloton allowed them to break free, as Cherel was best placed of the riders overall at sixteen minutes down. The trio held an advantage of three minutes after , when the race took a temporary halt after a police motorcycle collided with a car head-on, on the stage route. Both the occupant of the car and the motorcyclist were taken to hospital with non-life-threatening injuries; while the race itself was halted for 40 minutes.

Once the accident was cleared, the breakaway trio were allowed to leave with their original three-minute advantage, after the peloton had negated their gap through the time that they had been stopped. Their attacking impetus had been stunted however, as they were losing time quickly and were eventually caught prior to the stage's final climb of the day, the Alt de la Conresa. The lead quartet pushed on through the final intermediate sprint point in Mollet del Vallès, and managed to hold their advantage onto the Alt de la Conresa. Huguet could not live with the pace that was being set by Brajkovič, but his efforts were ultimately in vain as the main field quickly caught up to them prior to the summit of the climb.

Having done most of the work on the front,  had a rider go clear for a period, but Alberto Losada was brought back very quickly. 's Romain Bardet and Francis Mourey, the third  rider to make an attempt to get clear, both launched attacks prior to the final finishing circuit in Badalona. They both tried to set themselves up for long solo bids for victory, but the peloton closed them down as soon as they could build an advantage. With  and the field still together, it had the hallmarks for a bunch sprint; but  rider Samuel Sánchez attacked on a slight incline, hoping to achieve a small split in the field and move himself into second place overall behind 's Michael Albasini. Albasini finished in the pack to go into the final day with a lead of exactly 90 seconds, while behind Sánchez, thirteen riders were grouped together on the same time, two seconds behind Sánchez.

Stage 7
25 March 2012 — Badalona to Barcelona, 

The race ended with a short, yet tough, stage into Barcelona; as part of the  parcours, there were three third-category climbs and a second-category climb, all coming after the  mark. Nine riders representing seven teams contributed to the opening move of the stage, as they accelerated off the front of the main field after just . Their advantage, however, was always checked by the peloton, instead keeping the gap at a manageable distance. As such, the nine riders only held a lead of just over ninety seconds for most of the first half of the stage.

Ignatenko's team-mate Gatis Smukulis, a stage winner at the 2011 race and 's Aleksandr Dyachenko attacked on the second-category Alt de Tibidabo, coming with around  left on the stage. After Nicolas Edet joined them on the climb, Dyachenko went off the front again, and soloed away while his eight breakaway companions were caught.

Classification leadership table
In the 2012 Volta a Catalunya, four different jerseys were awarded. For the general classification, calculated by adding each cyclist's finishing times on each stage, the leader received a white and green jersey. This classification was considered the most important of the 2012 Volta a Catalunya, and the winner of the classification was considered the winner of the race. Additionally, there was a sprints classification, which awarded a white jersey. In the sprints classification, cyclists received points for finishing in the top 3 at intermediate sprint points during each stage.

There was also a mountains classification, the leadership of which was marked by a red jersey. In the mountains classification, points were won by reaching the top of a climb before other cyclists, with more points available for the higher-categorised climbs. The fourth jersey represented the Catalan rider classification, marked by a blue jersey. This was calculated in the same manner as the general classification, calculated by adding each Catalan cyclist's finishing times on each stage. There was also a classification for teams, in which the times of the best three cyclists per team on each stage were added together; the leading team at the end of the race was the team with the lowest total time.

Notes

References

External links

2012
Volta
2012 in Spanish road cycling
2012 UCI World Tour
March 2012 sports events in Europe